Asphalt Meadows is the tenth studio album by American rock band Death Cab for Cutie. It was released on September 16, 2022, through Atlantic Records. Produced by John Congleton, the album was preceded by the singles "Roman Candles", "Here to Forever" and "Foxglove Through the Clearcut".

Background and recording
In 2018, Death Cab for Cutie released its ninth studio album, Thank You for Today, which was the first to feature new members Dave Depper and Zac Rae, who joined the band in 2015, following the departure of longtime guitarist and producer Chris Walla. At the tail end of an extensive and successful tour in support of the album, the band issued a stopgap extended play, titled The Blue EP in 2019, which combined newly written material – recorded with producer Peter Katsis – with leftover songs from the Thank You for Today sessions.

The following year, the worldwide COVID-19 pandemic took hold, causing social and economic disruption; for the band, it altered their ability to tour and record in-person. While certain musical ideas and pieces predate the onset of the pandemic, much of Asphalt Meadows was written throughout the course of 2020 and 2021. For half of Asphalt Meadows, the band employed tactics to write material remotely, utilizing Dropbox to send files back and forth. On Monday, one band member would write a bed track for a new song, before handing it off to the next musician, and so on. Each musician had creative license to take the music wherever they felt comfortable, leading to more unexpected harmonic avenues. Gibbard likened the process to "chain-letter songwriting." The method gave rise to nearly ninety songs in varying stages of completion, later narrowed down to eleven for the record. The band initially began working on recording the material with a British producer, but "COVID and creative differences" forced the group to reconsider.

The band came together to record this material and more with producer John Congleton, a veteran musician who both engineered and mixed the project. Rae had first introduced Gibbard and Congleton in mid-2021, who developed a fast friendship. Asphalt Meadows was recorded mainly at United Recording and Grumpybeard in Los Angeles, with additional recording taking place at Studio Litho in the band's home of Seattle.

Composition

Musically, Asphalt Meadows has been described by music critics as indie rock, indie pop, post-punk. The opening track, "I Don't Know How I Survive", speaks directly to Gibbard's personal anxiety surrounding the pandemic. "Roman Candles" stemmed from the fact that the album lacked fast, more immediate songs, leading Gibbard to initially develop the song around a Faust sample. Congleton discarded the sample and instead built the track from heavily distorted kick drum sounds. "Rand McNally" takes its title from the American publishing company that produced physical maps and atlases. Gibbard wrote the song with former band members Chris Walla, Nathan Good and Michael Schorr in mind, noting: "This is my life's work. When members leave bands, they're often seminal members. That fans continue to support [the band] is a testament to how important the music is to them. I wanted to write something to and for everyone who has been in this band, who helped make it what it is, to say I'm not going to let the light fade." 

"Here to Forever" examines the passage of time; in the song, a protagonist views an old movie and observes that though the film remains, much of its participants are long dead. The post-rock inflected "Foxglove Through the Clearcut" anchors the middle of the record, and centers around a slow-building spoken word monologue interspersed with crashing guitar work. The song's origins date to the earliest years of the band: Gibbard discovered reels of four-track recordings he made from that period, and took a guitar part from one demo dating to 1998. He wrote the song about a fictional character—a man who "used to live by the ocean but never set foot in the sea"—but came around to finding some autobiography in his prose: "I started to realize that it's [about] me. Perhaps it’s because of the gap between the beginning of this composition and now, there was me at two different places in my life and I was speaking to myself after I’d had a long journey," he explained.

Reception

Asphalt Meadows received critical acclaim. At Metacritic, which assigns a normalized rating out of 100 to reviews from mainstream publications, the album received an average score of 82, based on 16 reviews, indicating "universal acclaim".

Tatiana Tenreyro at Spin called it their "best album in years", while Rick Quinn from PopMatters considered it a mid-career triumph, writing that it "doesn't merely repeat the melancholy of their work in the early aughts. Instead, it expands and deepens their signature sound without abandoning it." AllMusic's Neil Z. Yeung was effusive, commenting, "For a group so deep into their careers, the album sounds surprisingly urgent and revitalized [...] energetic highlights abound."

In a more reserved review for Pitchfork, Ian Cohen wrote that, "if Asphalt Meadows doesn’t amplify the stakes of forty-something romantic misunderstandings the way “A Movie Script Ending” or “Title and Registration” did in college, it at least unlocks the repressed memory of what it was like to be deeply moved by Death Cab for Cutie songs."

Track listing

Personnel
Death Cab for Cutie
Ben Gibbard – vocals, guitar, cover photograph
Jason McGerr – drums
Nick Harmer – bass guitar
Dave Depper – guitar, piano (track 4)
Zac Rae – keyboards

Additional personnel
Rachel Demy – additional art direction
Jon Roberts – assistant engineer
Scott Moore – assistant engineer
Mark Obriski – layout, design
Bob Ludwig – mastering
Michelle Shiers – interior photographs
John Congleton – production, engineering, mixing

Charts

References

2022 albums
Death Cab for Cutie albums